Ancilla cinnamomea is a species of sea snail, a marine gastropod mollusk in the family Ancillariidae.

Description
The shell grows to a length of 50 mm. Its spire is short and the whirls are indistinct. The pillar at its base has a thick, somewhat striated oblique enlargement.

Distribution
This marine species occurs off Tanzania, in the Red Sea; off India, Sri Lanka and the Philippines.

References

cinnamomea
Gastropods described in 1801